Oum el Bouaghi Airport   is a military airport located near Aïn Beïda, Oum El Bouaghi, Algeria.

See also
List of airports in Algeria

References

External links 
 Airport record for Oum el Bouaghi Airport at Landings.com
 OurAirports - Oum El Bouaghi
 Oum el Bouaghi
 

Airports in Algeria
Buildings and structures in Oum El Bouaghi Province